David Paul Steicke (born 28 October 1962 in Murray Bridge, South Australia) is a poker player based in Hong Kong. When the Asia Pacific Poker Tour brought poker to nearby Macau for the first time in November 2007, he placed third in the US$15,000 High Roller no limit Texas hold 'em event, winning US$110,592.

Steicke has gained a reputation as an expert at high roller no limit events. At the 2009 Aussie Millions A$100,000 no limit hold 'em Challenge (Event #8) Steicke earned his biggest career prize of A$1.2 million (US$807,780). David credited his win to a good run of cards but reporters at the event praised his impressive reads and aggressive play, which included a pivotal bluff against Tony Bloom.

In the hand, the flop came . Steicke's $100,000 bet into a $60,000 pot was called by Bloom. The  came on the turn. Steicke bet $150,000 and was again called by Bloom. When the  came on the river, putting 4 diamonds on board, Steicke fired once more with a $200,00 bet. A call was pondered by Bloom, but eventually he folded. The hand left Steicke in control with $1.4 million in chips, while Bloom was left crippled, having only $400,000 chips remaining. When later asked about the hand, David explained, "Tony Bloom was getting control of the table and in the end it was a bluff … at the time I wasn't really sure. I thought I had the jack of diamonds at first. I guess he laid down top pair, but I've laid down top pair before when there was four to a flush on board."

Steicke had his second biggest win (US$506,260) at the 2011 Epic Poker Main Event, where he finished second in a field of 97. He began heads-up play against Michael McDonald with a small chip lead and one point, had his opponent all-in. However, David's  did not improve against McDonald's pocket sixes.

As of 2011, Steicke has amassed $188,411 in winnings at the WSOP. Steicke's live tournament winnings of over $2,610,749 place him first on the all-time China money list.

References

External links
 Poker Pages profile
 ESPN360 interview
 Poker News interview
 Poker Listings interview

Chinese poker players
Australian poker players
People from Murray Bridge, South Australia
1962 births
Living people